Lee J. Roupas is a former Committeeman for the Palos Township Republican Organization as well as the former Chairman of the Cook County Republican Party in Cook County, Illinois. At a national level, Lee worked on the re-election campaign of President George W. Bush in Washington, D.C. as a Surrogate Event Coordinator, planning rallies for the President in battleground states across the country. He served the Republican Party on the 2004 Republican National Convention staff.  He served the Party on the 55th Presidential Inauguration staff and later as the Communications Director for the Republican Party of Virginia. Prior to being elected Chairman of the Cook County Republican Party, he served on the Cook County GOP Executive Committee under Chairmen Gary Skoien and Liz Gorman.

Early life 
He attended Amos Alonzo Stagg High School and is an alumnus of the Delta Alpha chapter of the Pi Kappa Alpha fraternity. He graduated from The George Washington University, where he served as President of the College Republicans.

Palos Township Republican Party 
After being elected Committeeman in March 2006 (defeating incumbent Committeeman John Minogue) at 23 years old he built on the party started by Anne S. Zickus and developed a party with an executive director, Deputy Committeemen and an organization to handle each city or village in the township. He was succeeded by Sean Morrison in 2012.

Law career
In 2011 he became an Assistant State's Attorney in Illinois, and in 2015 sought an appointment for a Republican vacancy on the Chicago Board of Election Commissioners with the support of former governor Jim Edgar.

Since 2016, Roupas has served as president of the Illinois Prosecutors Bar Association and in March 2019 condemned State Attorney Kim Foxx for her actions related to the Jussie Smollett hate crime hoax.

Family 
Roupas and his family live in the southwest suburban community of Palos Park, Illinois.

References

External links
Palos Township Republican Party's official website

1983 births
Living people
College Republicans
Illinois Republicans
Politicians from Cook County, Illinois